The Batumi Mosque (batumis mecheti, orta jame) is a mosque in Batumi, Adjara, Georgia, which is a home to a sizable Muslim community. It was commissioned by the family of Aslan Beg (the equivalent of duke) Khimshiashvili, a Muslim Georgian nobleman in 1866. The walls of the mosque were painted by the Laz brothers. The mosque is popularly known as the "Jamia in the middle" ("ორთა ჯამე", orta jame) for it once stood in between two other mosques which have not survived.

See also
 Islam in Georgia (country)
 List of mosques in Georgia (country)

References

1860s establishments in Georgia (country)
Mosques in Georgia (country)
Buildings and structures in Batumi
Mosques completed in 1866
Tourist attractions in Adjara
Grand mosques